Burnpur Cricket Club Ground is a multi purpose stadium in Asansol, West Bengal. The ground is mainly used for organizing matches of football, cricket and other sports.  It is a first class level cricket stadium. First-class match and List A match played on Burnpur Cricket Club Ground, Burnpur:

 23 October 1994 Deodhar Trophy 1994/95 Central Zone cricket team v  West Zone cricket team
 25 October 1994 Duleep Trophy 1994/95 Central Zone cricket team v West Zone cricket team

Since then the ground has been used for other matches until 2004.

References

External links 
 cricketarchive
 cricinfo

Defunct cricket grounds in India
Sports venues in West Bengal
Cricket grounds in West Bengal
Buildings and structures in Paschim Bardhaman district
Asansol
Sports venues completed in 1994
1994 establishments in West Bengal
20th-century architecture in India